Chesterfield Borough Council elections are held every four years. Chesterfield Borough Council is the local authority for the non-metropolitan district of Chesterfield in Derbyshire, England. Since the last boundary changes in 2003, 48 councillors have been elected from 20 wards.

Political control
Chesterfield was a municipal borough from 1836 until 1974. The borough was reformed under the Local Government Act 1972, gaining Staveley and Brimington and becoming a non-metropolitan district. The first election to the reformed council was held in 1973, initially operating as a shadow authority before coming into its powers on 1 April 1974. Since 1973 political control of the council has been held by the following parties:

Leadership
The leaders of the council since 2001 have been:

Council elections
1973 Chesterfield Borough Council election
1976 Chesterfield Borough Council election
1979 Chesterfield Borough Council election (New ward boundaries)
1983 Chesterfield Borough Council election
1987 Chesterfield Borough Council election
1991 Chesterfield Borough Council election (Borough boundary changes took place but the number of seats remained the same)
1995 Chesterfield Borough Council election
1999 Chesterfield Borough Council election
2003 Chesterfield Borough Council election (New ward boundaries increased the number of seats by one)
2007 Chesterfield Borough Council election
2011 Chesterfield Borough Council election
2015 Chesterfield Borough Council election
2019 Chesterfield Borough Council election

By-election results

1995-1999

1999-2003

2003-2007

2007-2011

2015-2019

2019-2022

References

 By-election results

External links
 Chesterfield Council

 
Council elections in Derbyshire
District council elections in England